José Daniel Damián Pulido (born 2 September 1992) is a Mexican footballer who played as a midfielder for Tecos.

He played with the Jaguares de Jalisco of the Liga de Balompié Mexicano, leading them to a runner-up finish in the 2021 season.

References

1992 births
Living people
Mexican footballers
Association football midfielders
Leones Negros UdeG footballers
Tecos F.C. footballers
Ascenso MX players
Liga Premier de México players
Footballers from Guadalajara, Jalisco
Liga de Balompié Mexicano players